The Oxfordshire Guardian Group was a collection of six free newspapers distributed throughout Oxfordshire in England. Launched in July 2011 the papers circulation in Oxfordshire include editions for Witney & Carterton, Oxford City, Abingdon, Didcot, Wallingford and Wantage & Grove.  The paper was published by independent publisher Taylor Newspapers and was a sister publication to the Basingstoke, Thatcham & Newbury Observer group of newspapers. The Oxfordshire Guardian claimed to be the highest circulation newspaper in Oxfordshire.

The newspapers closed in May 2018.

See also
 South Oxfordshire Courier
 Oxford Journal

References

External links
 

Free newspapers
Newspapers published in Oxfordshire